Shubael Pond is a  kettle pond on Flax Pond Road in Nickerson State Park in Barnstable, Massachusetts.

The pond has a popular swimming area and access for small boats or fishing is over that area.  Only electric motors are permitted on the pond.

Shubael Pond is stocked twice a year with several varieties of trout.

References

MassWildlife map and info

Brewster, Massachusetts
Ponds of Barnstable County, Massachusetts
Ponds of Massachusetts